Karthika Nair (born 27 June 1992) is a former Indian actress who primarily worked down South in all language films. She made her debut in the 2009 Telugu film Josh, opposite Naga Chaitanya. She rose to fame starring in her second and her first successful Tamil film Ko, opposite Jiiva and Piaa Bajpai. She found further success in the Malayalam film Proprietors: Kammath & Kammath, opposite Dileep. She is well known for her action roles in the comedy Brother of Bommali, the social drama Purampokku Engira Podhuvudamai and the Hindi epic TV series Aarambh.

Early life
Karthika was born to former Indian actress Radha. She has a brother and a sister, Thulasi Nair, who is also a South Indian actress. She did her schooling in Podar International School in Mumbai earned a degree in business from a London School of Economics-affiliated college.

Career
She made her acting debut at the age of 17 in the 2009 Telugu film Josh, opposite Naga Chaitanya. Though the film received mixed reviews, her performance as Vidya, an elementary school teacher desperate to attend college was received well. She received the Santosham Film Award for Best Debut Actress. Her second movie was in Tamil, called Ko, directed by famous film director K. V. Anand, with Jiiva and Piaa Bajpai in lead roles, which did very well at the box office. The film received cult status in the genre of political thrillers. Her performance as Renuka Narayanan, an investigative journalist, who exposes the blunders of politicians was hugely applauded. She received a nomination for SIIMA for Best supporting  Actress – Tamil  at 1st South Indian International Movie Awards. She then appeared in the Malayalam film Makaramanju, directed by Lenin Rajendran, starring alongside ace cinematographer and director Santosh Sivan. She donned a dual role, one of a painting model, Sugandha Bai and Urvashi, the Celestial beauty. Her first-ever dual role was well received and critics raved about her performance. British director Danny Boyle was highly impressed with her work in the film. She received SIIMA for Best Debut Actress – Malayalam at 1st SIIMA Awards and Kerala Film Critics Association Award for best debut actress.

In 2012, she appeared in a single Telugu film Dammu, directed by Boyapati Srinu, in a limited glamorous role. Her performance and the movie received mixed reviews and ended up being a commercial failure. She was paired with N. T. Rama Rao Jr. and shared screen space with Trisha.

In 2013, she appeared in the comedy film Proprietors: Kammath & Kammath, alongside Mammootty and Dileep. Her performance as Surekha, a mute Christian young widow who works in Indian Revenue Service was well received and so is the film. Later, she appeared in the titular role in the Tamil film Annakodi, directed by legendary filmmaker Bharathiraja.  Though the film received negative reviews, her performance as a damsel in distress received positive response. She made her Kannada debut with Brindavana, a remake of Telugu blockbuster Brindavanam. The film repeated the success of the original. In the film, she was paired with Darshan.

In 2014, she appeared in her third Telugu film Brother of Bommali, where she played Lucky, the streetwise tomboy twin sister of Allari Naresh's character. The film starred top comedians such as Brahmanandam, Ali and villains such as Kelly Dorji, Nagineedu and Vineet Kumar. In the film, she has donned a full-length comic role. Her performance received high critical acclaim and she received her first-ever Filmfare nomination in the category of Filmfare Award for Best Supporting Actress -Telugu  at 62nd Filmfare Awards South.

In 2015, she appeared in her third Tamil Political crime drama  film Purampokku Engira Podhuvudamai, directed by National Film Award winner S. P. Jananathan, alongside Arya, Vijay Sethupathi and Shaam. As part of her role, she learned how to ride a motorcycle. Her performance as Kuyili, a mastermind behind a prison break plan received a positive response. The film received commercial success and critical acclaim. Her portrayal of Kuyili is cited as a complete deprival of regular commercial heroine characterizations.

Her much delayed film Vaa Deal, starring Arun Vijay is yet to be released or would be considered unreleased & shelved forever.

Television Debut (2017) 
In the year 2017, Nair made her Television debut(after retiring from movies, since 2015) with the Epic drama Aarambh, written by V. Vijayendra Prasad and directed by Goldie Behl, which aired on Star Plus, starring opposite Rajneesh Duggal. In the series, she played Devasena, a warrior queen, which was well received by both audience and critics. The show aired its last on 10 September 2017.

Filmography
Films

Television

Awards and recognition

References

here are Kartika Nair's Latest Photoshoots

External links

 

Actresses in Kannada cinema
Actresses in Telugu cinema
Indian film actresses
Actresses in Tamil cinema
Actresses from Mumbai
Actresses from Chennai
Actresses in Malayalam cinema
Living people
Female models from Chennai
1992 births
21st-century Indian actresses
South Indian International Movie Awards winners